Helen Chow (born 17 August 1965) is a Malaysian swimmer. She competed in four events at the 1984 Summer Olympics.

References

External links
 

1965 births
Living people
Malaysian female swimmers
Olympic swimmers of Malaysia
Swimmers at the 1984 Summer Olympics
Place of birth missing (living people)
Southeast Asian Games medalists in swimming
Southeast Asian Games silver medalists for Malaysia
Southeast Asian Games bronze medalists for Malaysia
Competitors at the 1979 Southeast Asian Games